Sophonisba (fl. 203 BC) was a Carthaginian noblewoman.

Sophonisba may also refer to:

Arts and entertainment

 The Wonder of Women, or the Tragedy of Sophonisba, a 1606 tragedy by John Marston
 Sophonisba (Lee play), a 1675 tragedy by Nathaniel Lee
 Sophonisba (Thomson play), a 1730 tragedy by James Thomson
 Sophonisbe (tragedy), by Voltaire, 1770
 Sophonisbe, a 1663 dramatic work by Pierre Corneille

People
 Sofonisba Anguissola (c. 1532 – 1625), an Italian Renaissance painter 
 Sophonisba Angusciola Peale (1786–1859), an American ornithologist and artist
 Sophonisba Breckinridge (1866–1948), an American activist and Progressive Era social reformer

See also